SWEAP (Solar Wind Electrons Alphas and Protons) is an instrument on the unmanned space probe to the Sun, the Parker Solar Probe. The spacecraft with SWEAP on board was launched by a Delta IV Heavy on 12 August 2018 from Cape Canaveral, Florida. SWEAP includes two types of instruments, the Solar Probe Cup (SPC) and Solar Probe Analyzers (SPAN). SWEAP has four sensors overall, and is designed to take measurements of the Solar wind including electrons and ions of hydrogen (protons) and helium (these are the main components of the Solar wind and coronal plasma).

Design
SWEAP consists of the Solar Probe Cup (SPC), a faraday cup which faces the Sun and is designed to measure electrons and ions in the space environment near the Sun; the Solar Probe Analyzers (SPAN-A and SPAN-B); and the SWEAP electronics module (SWEM).

The Solar Probe Cup is a Sun facing instrument directly exposed to the Sun, and had to be designed to handle the high temperature conditions at 9-10 Solar radii from the Sun, that are planned for the mission. In operation it peeks out from the probes Sun shield, and is made entirely of refractory materials to endure these conditions. The wiring connecting to the electronics is made of niobium with sapphire insulators.

SPAN-A and B are behind the heat shield, oriented forward ("ram side") and backward along the spacecraft's orbit, and take electron and ion measurements overs a wide field of view. SPAN-A measure ions and electrons and SPAN-B measures electrons.

Summary:
Solar Probe Cup (SPC): Outside solar shield directly exposed to the Sun
Solar Probe Analyzers (SPAN)
SPAN-Ai: ion electrostatic analyzer (ESA) on the ram side
SPAN-Ae: electron electrostatic analyzer on the ram side
SPAN-B: electron electrostatic analyzer on the anti-ram side
SWEAP Electronics Module (SWEM)

Operations
By September 2018, SWEAP had been turned on and first light data was returned.

Location

See also
Jovian Auroral Distributions Experiment (also can measure ions, on the Juno Jupiter orbiter)
JEDI (also can measure ions, on the Juno Jupiter orbiter)
SWAP (New Horizons), measures the Solar Wind on the New Horizons mission to Pluto and beyond
Other instruments on PSP
FIELDS
IS☉IS
WISPR

References

Parker Solar Probe
Spacecraft instruments